Head count may refer to:

 Capite censi, a Latin expression referring to the non-nobility
 Head count (Australian rules football)
 HeadCount, a democracy non-profit organisation in the United States